In Christianity, the word state may be taken to signify a profession or calling in life. St. Paul says, in I Corinthians 7:20: "Let every man abide in the same calling in which he was called". States are classified in the Catholic Church as the clerical state, the religious state, and the secular state; and among religious states, again, we have those of the contemplative, the active, and the mixed orders.

See also
Catholic religious order
Consecrated life
Diocesan priest
Religious minister
Secular clergy
Vocational Discernment in the Catholic Church

Notes

 
Catholic ecclesiastical titles